Jhumpa, composed of twin villages of Jhumpa Kalan and Jhumpa Khurd, are in the Loharu (Vidhan Sabha constituency), Siwani Tehsil of the Bhiwani District in the Indian state of Haryana. Close to the border with Rajasthan state, the census code is 06-state, 081-district, 00401-tehsil and 53-village. , the village had 144 households.

Location
It is situated on India's National Highway No. 65 i.e. NH-65 which is to be upgraded to NH-52 in near future. It has a railway station as well.

Facilities
It has a small hospital i.e. Primary Health Care Center(PHC), Veterinary Hospital, Post Office, a rest house, numerous petrol pumps, small market(which is growing day by day), police station, bus stand where one can catch a bus anytime, medicine stores, Kshetriya Gramin Bank (a subsidiary of Punjab National Bank), Sahkari Smiti Bank (Mini Bank) etc. All the basic facilities are available in the village e.g. water, electricity, medical, transportation, Govt. School up to class 12th (separate school for girls is under construction as of January 2015). Farming is the main source of income though most part of the land is rain-dependent. Rainfall has been very low in the recent years. The village is expected to be a growing hub for agro-business in near future.

References

External links
 Haryana Government e-Services
 Bhiwani District Website
 e-Disha e-services
 Government of India e-services

See also

 Badya Jattan
 Bidhwan
 Kalali
 Kanwari
 Mandholi Kalan
 Mandholi Khurd
 Zaildar
 List of Zaildars by Zail

Villages in Bhiwani district
Archaeological sites in Haryana